Mordellina atrofusca is a species of beetle in the genus Mordellina. It was described in 1951.

The Latin specific epithet atrofusca refers to dark-swarthy, dark-brown coloured, atro-fuscus.

References

Mordellidae
Beetles described in 1951